Rockton may refer to:

Rockton, Illinois
Rockton Township, Winnebago County, Illinois
Rockton, a hamlet in Amsterdam (town), New York
Rockton, Pennsylvania
Rockton, Wisconsin
Rockton, prior name for Little Falls (city), New York
Rockton, setting of the novel City of the Lost
Rockton World's Fair an annual festival in Hamilton, Ontario, Canada
Rockton, South Carolina a locality served by the Rockton and Rion Railway 
Rockton, Ontario, Canada served by the nearby Rockton Airport
Rockton and Rion Railroad Historic District
Rockton Mountain
Rockton, Ipswich, a heritage-listed villa at Rockton Street in  Newtown, City of Ipswich, Queensland, Australia